Jesse Woolley (born 27 March 2001) is an English professional footballer who plays as striker for FA WSL club Bristol City.

Career statistics

Club 
As of 08 August 2022.

References

External links

Soccerway Profile 
Bristol City Profile

2001 births
Living people
English women's footballers
Women's Super League players
Women's association football midfielders
Bristol City W.F.C. players
Women's Championship (England) players